In Norse mythology, Snær (Old Norse Snærr, East Norse Sniō, Latin Nix, Nivis, English "snow") is seemingly a personification of snow, appearing in extant text as an euhemerized legendary Scandinavian king.

Icelandic tradition
In the Orkneyinga saga, Snow the Old (Snærr hinn gamli) is son of Frosti 'frost' son of Kári. In the account called Hversu Noregr byggdist ('How Norway was inhabited') in the Flatey Book, Snær is son of Jökul (Jǫkull 'icicle, ice, glacier') son of Kári. This Kári is lord of the wind and brother of Ægir or Hlér and Logi, all three being sons of the giant Fornjót. Fornjót was the king of "Gotlandi, Kænlandi and Finnlandi" and Snaer bears the title of a king too.

Snow's son in Orkneyinga saga and Hversu is Thorri 'frozen-snow'. The Hversu also gives Snow three daughters: Fön (Fǫnn 'Snowdrift'), Drífa 'snowfall', and Mjöl (Mjǫll, 'powdered snow'). Sturlaugs saga (section 22) brings in King Snow of Finmark and his daughter Mjöl who flies quickly through the air.

The Ynglinga saga relates how Vanlandi the ruler of Sweden visited Snow and married his daughter Drífa, but left in the spring and did not return. Drífa bore Vanlandi a son called Vísbur. See Vanlandi for further details.

The Hversu also mentions in passing, when speaking of Snær's distant descendant Halfdan the Old, that Snær's life lasted three hundred years.

Snow's son Thorri reigned as king after Snow, and had two sons named Nór and Gór and a daughter named Gói ('thin snow, track-snow'). See Nór to follow this lineage further.

Danish tradition

Snow and Lǣ
A legendary Danish king named Snow (Sniō) appears in the Annales Ryensis, section 14, and in the Chronicon Lethrense, section 5, between the reigns of Helgi and Hrólf Kraki.

The Chronicon Lethrense inserts the common folktale of the dog king after Helgi's death. In this account King Hākun of Sweden sent a small dog to the Danes to take as their king but warned that whoever told him of the death of the dog would lose his life. One day, when larger dogs are fighting, the small dog sprang to the floor among them and was torn to death. Then Lǣ, the giant of Lǣsø̄ (Læsø), gave some advice on the matter to his herdsman Snow. (Lǣ is a Danish form of Hlér, a common name for Ægir who is Snow's great-granduncle in the Norse tradition). Snow went to Hākun's court and by riddling talk eventually got the king himself to say that the dog was dead. Snow was then appointed king of Denmark in place of the dog. Snow was a vicious, oppressive, and dishonest king. Snow sent his servant named Roth 'Red', whom he disliked, to the giant Lǣ to ask about how Snow will die, intending that Lǣ would kill Roth who would be unable to pass his tests. Roth passed and Lǣ gave Roth two gloves to take to Snow in answer. Snow put them on in an assembly and lice suddenly attacked him and ate him to death. Thereupon Helgi's son Hrólf was made king.

The Annals of Lund tells the same tale, save that the king of Sweden is Adils which harmonizes with other tales in which Adils reigns over Sweden during the reigns of Helgi and his son Hrólf Kraki.

Snow son of Sivald
Saxo Grammaticus in his Gesta Danorum inserts the reign of Snow much later in Danish history, telling of him in book VIII among kings who reigned after the death of Harald War-tooth. Here Snow is a rightful king of Denmark, son of King .

Of King Sivald Saxo tells nothing save that Sivald was son of Broder, son of King Jarmerik (who is actually Ermanaric King of the Ostrogoths changed by Saxo or one of his sources into a king of Denmark).

Saxo makes Snow a brave Viking during his father's lifetime, who after gaining the crown crushed two champions named Eskil and Alkil and so regained Scania. Saxo then follows with a romantic tale of Snow's love for the daughter of an unnamed King of Götaland whom Snow eventually defeated in a single combat with the terms that the winner would rule both Denmark and Götaland. But finding that the dead king's daughter had been married to the king of Sweden, also unnamed here, Snow with the aid of an accomplice disguised as a beggar abducted her. Indecisive war with Sweden followed.

Then came a famine because of bad weather, this perhaps being an allegory having to do with Snow as a personification. Because of the lack of grain, Snow forbade making strong drink from grain and ordered abstinence from drinking alcohol on pain of death. Saxo follows with a tale of a lush who saved himself from death with clever excuses and finally convinced Snow to rescind those laws.

Then Saxo introduces Paul the Deacon's account of the origin of the Lombards which he summarizes. Paul the Deacon and made the Lombards to have been originally from an island of Scandza in the far north. According to Saxo this famine and the departure of many Danes explained why in his own day much of the Danish land was overrun with forests in which stone piles alone showed that the land had once been cultivated fields.

Snow was succeeded by his son Biorn.

Alternative spellings
Alternative Anglicizations are Ægir: Aegir ; Drífa: Drifa ; Fön: Fönn ; Hlér: Hler ; Jökul: Iökul ; Lǣ: Lee ; Mjöl: Mjol, Miöll ; Snær: Snaer, Snœr, Snow.

Mythological kings of Denmark
Personifications in Norse mythology
Snow in culture
fi:Snaer